Ortaqışlaq (also, Bitlikyshlak and Orta Kyshlak) is a village in the Tovuz Rayon of Azerbaijan.

References 

Populated places in Tovuz District